Psyche (Psyché in French) is the Greek term for "soul" (ψυχή).

Psyche may also refer to:

Psychology
 Psyche (psychology), the totality of the human mind, conscious and unconscious
 Psyche, an 1846 book about the unconscious by Carl Gustav Carus
 Psyche, an 1890-94 book about the ancient Greek concept of soul by Erwin Rohde
 Psyche (consciousness journal), a periodical on the study of consciousness
 Psyche, a digital magazine on psychology published by Aeon
 Psyche Cattell, (1893–1989), American psychologist

Religion and mythology
 Psyche (mythology), a mortal woman in Greek mythology who became the wife of Eros and the goddess of the soul
 Soul in the Bible, spirit or soul in Judaic and Christian philosophy and theology

Arts and media

Based on Cupid and Psyche
The story of Cupid and Psyche, mainly known from the Latin novel by Apuleius, and depicted in many forms:
Cupid and Psyche (Capitoline Museums), a Roman statue
Marlborough gem, a 1st-century carved cameo 
Landscape with Psyche Outside the Palace of Cupid, a 1664 painting by Claude Lorrain, National Gallery London 
 Psyché (play), a 1671 tragedy-ballet by Molière
 Psyche (Locke), a semi-opera of 1675 with music by Matthew Locke
 Psyché (opera), a 1678 opera with music by Jean-Baptiste Lully
 A 1714 violin sonata by Italian composer Michele Mascitti**Psyche Revived by Cupid's Kiss a sculpture of 1793 by Antonio Canova
 Psyche, a six-canto allegorical poem by Mary Tighe first published in 1805
 Cupid and Psyche (Thorvaldsen), a sculpture of 1808, Copenhagen
 Love and Psyche (David), a painting of 1817, now in Cleveland
 Eros and Psyche (Robert Bridges), poem of 1885
 An 1888 symphonic poem by Belgian composer César Franck
 An 1898 fairy tale by Louis Couperus
 A 1924 classical music composition by Manuel de Falla

Music
 Psyche (band), a Canadian dark synthpop music group (formed 1982)
 Psyche (album), a 1994 album by PJ & Duncan
 A 2009 electronica song by Massive Attack on Splitting the Atom
 "Psyche-Out", a 1963 instrumental by The Original Surfaris
 The Psyche (Revolutionary Ensemble album), 1975

Other media
 A 1972 fictive anthology by Sándor Weöres
 Danielle Moonstar, a character in the Marvel Comics universe
 "Psyche" (Duckman), a 1994 episode of Duckman

Science and technology

Biology
 Psyche (entomology journal), a periodical on entomology
 Psyche (moth), a genus of moths in the bagworm family (Psychidae)
 Leptosia nina, or Psyche, a species of butterfly

Other uses in science and technology
 16 Psyche, an asteroid
 Psyche (Red Hat Linux)

Vessels
 Psyche (spacecraft), an upcoming NASA orbiter of the metallic asteroid 16 Psyche
 HMS Psyche, one of various British naval ships
 USS Psyche V (SP-9), a United States patrol vessel
 French frigate Psyché (1804)

See also

 
 Psy (disambiguation)
 Psych (disambiguation)
 Psycho (disambiguation)
 Psychic (disambiguation)
 Psychedelic (disambiguation)
 Soul (disambiguation)

Greek